Chadegan (also Romanized as Chādegān and Chādgān; also known as Chadgūn and Chadūgān) is a city and capital of Chadegan County, in western Isfahan Province, Iran.  At the 2006 census, its population was 7,037, in 1,872 families.

Dam and reservoir
Chadegan Reservoir on the Zayandeh Rood river is the largest in Isfahan Province. It was formed in 1972 by the Zayandeh Dam. The dam was initially named Shah Abbas Dam after Shah Abbas I, the most influential king of the Safavid dynasty, but it was changed to Zayandeh Dam after the Islamic revolution in 1979. Since 1972, the Chadegan Reservoir has helped prevent seasonal flooding of the Zayandeh River.

References

External links

 "Chadgan, Iran" Fallingrain Gazetteer

Populated places in Chadegan County
Cities in Isfahan Province